Matt H. Graham-Williams (born 16 August 2000) is a New Zealand rugby union player who plays for  in the Bunnings NPC.  His position is Prop.

Career 
Graham-Williams was born in the small far north town of Kaeo. He was named in the Tasman Mako squad for the 2021 Bunnings NPC as a development player. Graham-Williams made his debut for Tasman against  at Trafalgar Park in a non competition match, starting in the number 1 jersey in a 26–9 win for the Mako.

References

External links
itsrugby.co.uk profile

New Zealand rugby union players
2000 births
Living people
People educated at Saint Kentigern College
Rugby union props
Tasman rugby union players